Abraham Kurkindolle Allison (December 10, 1814 – July 8, 1893) was a Florida businessman and politician. He served in the Florida Territorial Legislature and the Florida State House of Representatives. He served as the sixth Governor of Florida, at the end of the American Civil War.

Early life 
Allison was born in Jones County, Georgia, on December 10, 1814, to Captain James and Sarah Fannin Allison. After he graduated from school, he worked as a merchant in Columbus, Georgia, and in Henry County, Alabama. He then moved to Apalachicola, Florida, where he served as the city's first mayor. He also served as the first county judge of Franklin County and as Clerk of the United States Court. He was a member of the Territorial Legislature. In the Seminole War, he was captain of the Franklin Rifles. He moved to Quincy, Gadsden County in 1839 and there commenced the practice of law.

In 1843, he built a Georgian colonial home in Quincy. In 1989 it became the Allison House Inn, a bed and breakfast.

Early political career 
He was again elected to the Territorial Legislature, and represented Gadsden County in the State Legislature in 1845, 1847 and 1852.  As Speaker of the House, he assumed the duties of acting Governor on September 16, 1853, because both Governor Thomas Brown and Senate President R. J. Floyd were out of the state. He gave up the office on the inauguration of James E. Broome on  October 3. Allison did not exercise executive powers and  merely held himself in readiness should a need arise.

He was a member of the Constitutional Convention of 1861. He served during the Confederacy in the Florida State Senate from 1862 through 1864.

Governorship and later life 
After Governor John Milton died on April 1, 1865 either from an accident or suicide, Allison, as the state senate president, assumed the office of Governor. He resigned his office on May 19, 1865, and went into hiding the day before Federal troops formally occupied Tallahassee.  He was captured by Union forces on June 19, 1865, and held for several months at Fort Pulaski.

After his release, he returned to Quincy to practice law.  During the election of 1870, Allison led a band of armed men to block black voters from the polls until they closed.  This nearly eliminated the Republican majority in Gadsden County. In 1872, he was convicted of "intimidating Negroes" for this incident and jailed for six months and fined.

He died in Quincy, Florida, on July 8, 1893.

Notes

References 
 Official Governor's portrait and biography from the State of Florida
 Morris, Allen  and Joan Perry Morris, compilers. The Florida Handbook 2007-2008 31st Biennial Edition. Page 309.  Peninsula Publishing. Tallahassee. 2007.  Softcover  Hardcover

Confederate States Army officers
Democratic Party governors of Florida
People from Quincy, Florida
People from Jones County, Georgia
People of Florida in the American Civil War
Members of the Florida Territorial Legislature
19th-century American politicians
Democratic Party Florida state senators
Presidents of the Florida Senate
1810 births
1893 deaths
Mayors of places in Florida
American people of the Seminole Wars
Confederate States of America state governors
Activists from Florida
Speakers of the Florida House of Representatives
Democratic Party members of the Florida House of Representatives